Leptocarpus tenax  is a species of plant in the family Restionaceae. It is perennial, dioecious herb found in many moist parts of eastern and southern Australia and often seen growing from 50 to 130 cm tall, with stems 1 to 2 mm in diameter. The specific epithet tenax is derived from Latin, meaning "holding fast".

References 

Restionaceae
Taxa named by Robert Brown (botanist, born 1773)
Plants described in 1810
Flora of Australia